Ivan Večtomov (Иван Николаевич Вечтомов, January 22, 1902, Yekaterinburg – April 25, 1981, Prague) was a Czech composer and cellist of Russian origin. He was the father of Czech cellist Saša Večtomov and guitarist Vladimír Večtomov and the uncle of Russian painter Nikolai Evgenievich Vechtomov.

Education
Večtomov studied at Prague Conservatory under Ladislav Zelenka, then from 1928 to 1930 in Paris under Diran Alexanian.

Career
Beginning in 1931 Večtomov served as cellist for the Prague Quartet. In 1945 he became concertmaster of the Czech Philharmonic.

In 1949 Večtomov interpreted the premiere of "Concertino for cello, wind & brass ensemble, percussion & piano in C minor" by Bohuslav Martinů, under direction of Václav Neumann.

As soloist Večtomov collaborated with renowned musicians including Zuzana Růžičková.

From 1951 until retirement, Večtomov taught at Prague Conservatory.

References

External links

Ivan Večtomov at Supraphon

Ivan Večtomov at musicbase.cz

Prague Conservatory alumni
1902 births
Czech people of Russian descent
Czech cellists
Czech composers
Czech male composers
1981 deaths
20th-century Czech male musicians
Musicians from Yekaterinburg
Russian emigrants to Czechoslovakia
20th-century cellists